Austrosassia is a genus of sea snails, a marine gastropod mollusc in the family Cymatiidae.

Species
The genus contains the following species:
 Austrosassia parkinsonia (Perry, 1811)
 Austrosassia ponderi (Beu, 1987)
Species brought into synonymy
 Austrosassia pahaoaensis Vella, 1954 †: synonym of Sassia pahaoaensis (Vella, 1954) †
 Austrosassia parkinsoniana [sic]: synonym of Austrosassia parkinsonia (Perry, 1811) (misspelling)
 Austrosassia procera Finlay, 1931 †: synonym of Sassia minima (Hutton, 1873) † (original combination)
 Austrosassia pusulosa Marwick, 1965 †: synonym of Sassia pusulosa (Marwick, 1965) † (original combination)
 Austrosassia zealta Laws, 1939 †: synonym of Sassia zealta (Laws, 1939) † (original combination)

References

 Finlay H.J. (1931). On Austrosassia, Austroharpa, and Austrolithes, new genera; with some remarks on the gastropod protoconch. Transactions of the New Zealand Institute. 62: 7-19.

External links
 Strong E.E., Puillandre N., Beu A.G., Castelin M. & Bouchet P. (2019). Frogs and tuns and tritons – A molecular phylogeny and revised family classification of the predatory gastropod superfamily Tonnoidea (Caenogastropoda). Molecular Phylogenetics and Evolution. 130: 18-34

Cymatiidae
Gastropod genera